Mount Witherspoon is a 12,012-foot-elevation (3,661 meter) glaciated summit located  northwest of Valdez in the Chugach Mountains of the U.S. state of Alaska. It's set on land managed by Chugach National Forest. It is the second-highest peak in the Dora Keen Range, which is the 25-miles-long divide separating Harvard Glacier from Yale Glacier. The mountain's name was officially adopted in 1928 by the U.S. Board on Geographic Names to honor David C. Witherspoon, a U.S. Geological Survey topographer for 30 years, "who at the time of his retirement in 1921 had mapped a greater area of Alaska than any other man." The first ascent of Mount Witherspoon was made June 25, 1957, by David Bohn, Arthur Maki, Jr., Martin Mushkin, and Lawrence E. Nielsen.

Climate

Based on the Köppen climate classification, Mount Witherspoon is located in a subarctic climate zone with long, cold, snowy winters, and mild summers. Weather systems coming off the Gulf of Alaska are forced upwards by the Chugach Mountains (orographic lift), causing heavy precipitation in the form of rainfall and snowfall. Temperatures can drop below −20 °C with wind chill factors below −30 °C. This climate supports the Harvard, Yale, and Columbia Glaciers surrounding this mountain. The months May through June offer the most favorable weather for climbing or viewing.

See also

List of mountain peaks of Alaska
Geography of Alaska

References

External links
 Weather: Mount Witherspoon
 National Weather Service Forecast
 Mt. Witherspoon photo

Witherspoon
Witherspoon
Witherspoon